John Nichols may refer to:

 John Nichols (printer) (1745–1826), English printer and author
 John Nichols (law enforcement officer), (1918–1998), American law enforcement officer and politician
 John Bowyer Nichols (1779–1863), English printer and antiquary, son of the above
 John Gough Nichols (1806–1873), son of John Bowyer Nichols, English printer and antiquary
 John G. Nichols (1812–1898), mayor of Los Angeles
 John Nichols (politician) (1834–1917), U.S. Representative from North Carolina
 John Nichols (Worcestershire cricketer) (1878–1952), English cricketer
 John Treadwell Nichols (1883–1958), American ichthyologist
 John Conover Nichols (1896–1945), United States Representative from Oklahoma
 John B. Nichols (1931–2004), aviator and writer
 John Nichols (writer) (born 1940), author of The Milagro Beanfield War
 John Nichols (journalist) (born 1959), American journalist and media activist
 John F. Nichols, U.S. National Guard general and Adjutant General of Texas
 John Nichols (British Army officer) (1896–1954)
 John A. Nichols, American farmer and politician from New York
 John J. Nichols, United States Air Force general 
 John Nichols (diplomat), British diplomat and Ambassador to Switzerland
 John Nichols, former member of the indie rock band Low

See also
 Jon Nichols (born 1981), English footballer
 John H. Nichols House, historic building in Wapakoneta, Ohio
 Jack Nichols (disambiguation)
 John Nichol (disambiguation)
 John Nicholls (disambiguation)